The R180 road is a  regional road in County Monaghan, Ireland.

References

Regional roads in the Republic of Ireland
Roads in County Monaghan